Furtick is a surname. Notable people with the surname include:

Fritz Furtick (1882–1962), American football player
Steven Furtick (born 1980), American Christian pastor and songwriter

Americanized surnames
Surnames of German origin